Earl Roy Gros (August 29, 1940 – July 15, 2013) was an American football running back who played in the National Football League (NFL) for nine seasons . Born and raised in Louisiana, he played college football at Louisiana State University (LSU) in Baton Rouge.

Gros was selected in the first round of the 1962 NFL Draft by the Green Bay Packers and in the second round of the AFL Draft by the Houston Oilers.  Gros opted for the NFL, where he backed up fellow LSU Tiger Jim Taylor at fullback and the Packers repeated as NFL champions in his rookie season in 1962. He played two seasons in Green Bay, then was traded with hall of fame center Jim Ringo to the Philadelphia Eagles for linebacker Lee Roy Caffey (and a first round draft choice) in May 1964. The draft choice was used to select halfback  Donny Anderson as a "future pick" in the 

He finished his career with 821 rushes for 3,157 yards (3.8 yards per carry) and 28 touchdowns; he also had 142 receptions for 1,255 yards (8.8 yards per reception) and ten touchdowns.

Gros died at age 72 in Louisiana.

References

External links
 
 

1940 births
2013 deaths
People from Lafourche Parish, Louisiana
Players of American football from Louisiana
American football running backs
LSU Tigers football players
Green Bay Packers players
Philadelphia Eagles players
Pittsburgh Steelers players
New Orleans Saints players